Charlotte Isabel Wheeler-Cuffe (24 May 1867 – 8 March 1967) was an amateur botanical artist, plant collector and gardener.

Life
Williams was born on 24 May 1867 in Wimbledon, London, to a family with Irish connections, her maternal grandfather being the Rev. Sir Hercules Langrishe, third Baronet of Knocktopher, County Kilkenny. Her father, William Williams (1816–1907), was a President of The Law Society of England and Wales.

Her pet name was "Shadow". She was taught by a governess at home, and later studied painting under the guidance of Frank Calderon.

In the summer of 1897 at Lodsworth parish church in Sussex, she married Otway Fortescue Wheeler-Cuffe (who was to inherit the Wheeler-Cuffe baronetcy when his uncle, Sir Charles Wheeler-Cuffe, second baronet, died in January 1915). Otway Wheeler-Cuffe (1866–1934) who was born in Southsea, Hampshire, was a civil engineer employed by the 1890s in the Public Works Department in Burma. They travelled together to Burma immediately after their marriage. In Burma, she was sometimes able to accompany Otway when he went on official inspection tours of the roads in remote regions. She described these tours in some of the hundreds of weekly letters to her mother. After her mother's death in 1916, she continued the routine of writing once a week to her husband's cousin, Baroness Pauline Prochazka (1842–1930) who then lived at Leyrath, Kilkenny. Another correspondent was Sir Frederick Moore, the Keeper of the Royal Botanic Gardens, Glasnevin, Dublin.

In 1911, on Mount Victoria – also called Nat Ma Taung – Charlotte Wheeler-Cuffe found two new species of rhododendron: Rhododendron burmacium, a low, busy shrub with pale yellow flowers and a second species, later named Rhododendron cuffeanum, which has white flowers and grows on pine trees. Living plants of both species were sent to the Royal Botanic Gardens, Glasnevin, where they grew and bloomed. Another plant from the mountain, known as Shadow's buttercup, was the blue-flowered Anemone obtusiloba f. patula. She was a keen gardener and would collect living plants in the wild and bring them into her garden, sometimes also sending material to family and friends in England and Ireland, including the exquisite Shan lily (Lilium sulphureum).

Wheeler-Cuffe was invited by the authorities to undertake the formation of a botanical garden at Maymyo (now Pyin U Lwin). She readily agreed and worked on the layout and planting of this garden between 1916 and 1921 when she and her husband left Burma.

The Wheeler-Cuffes returned to Europe, and settled in the Cuffe family home at Leyrath, outside Kilkenny, Ireland. She died at Leyrath on 8 March 1967, just 11 weeks short of her one hundredth birthday

Publication
While in Burma she produced The Burma alphabet, a book illustrated by her watercolours. This was sold at five rupees a copy to raise funds for a new hospital, the Queen Alexandra's Children's Hospital, in Mandalay.

Legacy
Wheeler-Cuffe instructed that her watercolours of Burmese orchids and other plants should remain "indefinitely" in the National Botanic Gardens, Glasnevin. Later, her correspondence with her mother and Polly Prochazka was also deposited there by Captain Anthony Tupper, as well as a number of her sketchbooks. However, watercolours (landscapes of Ireland and Burma) and miscellaneous other items were sold when the contents of Leyrath were auctioned in September 1993, and so are widely scattered.

See also
 List of Irish botanical illustrators
 List of Irish plant collectors
 Patricia Butler, Irish Botanical Illustrators, Antique Collectors Club, London 2000

References

External links
  Frank Kingdon Ward, commissioned drawing
 National Botanic Gardens Art Collection

1867 births
1967 deaths
19th-century Irish painters
19th-century Irish women
20th-century Irish painters
20th-century Irish women
Botanical illustrators
Irish gardeners
People from British Burma
Wives of baronets
People from Wimbledon, London
People from County Kilkenny